Semyonovskoye is a rural locality (a village) in Novlenskoye Rural Settlement, Vologodsky District, Vologda Oblast, Russia. The population was 4 as of 2002.

Geography 
The distance to Vologda is 64 km, to Novlenskoye is 4 km.

References 

Rural localities in Vologodsky District